Thomas Brandon Spoon (born July 5, 1978) is a former American football linebacker in the National Football League (NFL) who played one season for the Buffalo Bills. He was drafted in the fourth round of the 2001 NFL Draft. In his only season he was the Bills starting middle linebacker.

References

External links
 North Carolina  profile
 ESPN player profile

1978 births
Living people
American football linebackers
Buffalo Bills players
North Carolina Tar Heels football players
People from Burlington, North Carolina
Players of American football from North Carolina